Conus quasimagus is a species of sea snail, a marine gastropod mollusk in the family Conidae, the cone snails, cone shells or cones.

These snails are predatory and venomous. They are capable of "stinging" humans.

Description
The length of the shell attains 59.3 mm.

Distribution
This marine species of cone snail occurs off the Philippines.

References

 Bozzetti L. (2016). Pionoconus quasimagus (Gastropoda: Prosobranchia: Conidae) nuove specie dalle Filippine meridionali. Malacologia Mostra Mondiale. 92: 13–14.

quasimagus
Gastropods described in 2016